The Ministry of Labour and Social Affairs of the Czech Republic is a government ministry, which was established in 1969.

External links
 

Czech Republic
Labour and Social Affairs
Ministries established in 1969
1969 establishments in Czechoslovakia